Copiula exspectata is a species of frog in the family Microhylidae.
It is endemic to West Papua, Indonesia.
Its natural habitat is subtropical or tropical moist lowland forests.
It is threatened by habitat loss.

References

Copiula
Amphibians of Western New Guinea
Taxonomy articles created by Polbot
Amphibians described in 2002